Inquilab Zindabad is a Urdu phrase, which translates to "Long live the revolution". It was first used by Muhammad Iqbal. Although originally the slogan was used by leftists in the British Raj, today it is used in India and Pakistan by civil society activists during protests as well as by politicians from various ideological backgrounds.

History 
This slogan was coined by the Islamic scholar, Urdu poet, Indian freedom fighter, prominent leader of Indian National Congress and one of the founders of communist party of India, Maulana Hasrat Mohani in 1921.
It was popularized by Bhagat Singh (1907–1931) during the late 1920s through his speeches and writings. It was also the official slogan of the 
Hindustan Socialist Republican Association, and the slogan of Communist Consolidation as well as a slogan of the All India Azad Muslim Conference.
In April 1929, this slogan was raised by Bhagat Singh and his associate B. K. Dutt who had shouted this after bombing the Central Legislative Assembly in Delhi.
Later, for the first time in an open court, this slogan was raised in June 1929 as part of their joint statement at the High Court in Delhi.
Since then, it became one of the rallying cries of the Indian independence movement. In Indian political novels chronicling the independence movement, a pro-independence sentiment is often characterized by characters shouting this slogan.

See also
Amitabh Bachchan (Inquilaab Srivastava)

References

Indian independence movement
Political catchphrases
Indian political slogans
Memorials to Bhagat Singh